Pavel Vladimirovich Yakovlev (born 7 April 1991) is a Russian football player who plays in Kazakhstan for Kyzylzhar. His primary position is left winger.

Career
Pavel Yakovlev was born in the Moscow suburb of Lyubertsy and started his football education at local Zvezda football school. The youngster was noted by Saturn and Spartak youth scouts, and he moved to the Spartak youth academy.

He made his debut for Spartak Moscow in the Russian Premier League on 13 June 2009 in a game against FC Khimki.

Although at school and in the reserves Yakovlev played chiefly as a striker, in the main squad of his team he is often used as a winger.

On 31 August 2016, Yakovlev signed a three-year contract with Anzhi Makhachkala. On 2 July 2018, Yakovlev was released by Anzhi.

On 23 July 2018, he joined Krylia Sovetov Samara for the fourth time.

On 19 August 2021, he moved to Kyzylzhar in Kazakhstan.

International career
Yakovlev was a part of the Russia U-21 side that competed in the 2011 European Under-21 Championship qualification.

Career statistics

Club

Notes

References

External links
 Profile on the Russian Football National League site

1991 births
People from Lyubertsy
Living people
Russian footballers
Russia youth international footballers
Russia under-21 international footballers
Association football forwards
FC Spartak Moscow players
PFC Krylia Sovetov Samara players
FC Mordovia Saransk players
FC Anzhi Makhachkala players
FC Fakel Voronezh players
FC Kyzylzhar players
Russian Premier League players
Russian First League players
Kazakhstan Premier League players
Russian expatriate footballers
Expatriate footballers in Kazakhstan
FC Spartak-2 Moscow players
Sportspeople from Moscow Oblast